Dysart in Fife was a royal burgh that returned one commissioner to the Parliament of Scotland and to the Convention of Estates.

After the Acts of Union 1707, Dysart, Burntisland, Kinghorn and Kirkcaldy formed the Dysart district of burghs, returning one member between them to the House of Commons of Great Britain.

List of burgh commissioners

 1661–63, 1665 convention: David Symson, councillor 
 1667 convention: William Symson, bailie 
 1669–74: Henry Beattie, bailie 
 1678 convention: George Symson 
 1681–82: John Reddie the younger, merchant, bailie 
 1685–86, 1689 convention, 1689–90; David Chrystie 
 1695–1702: Alexander Swinton   
 1702–03: David Chrystie of Balsillie (died c.1702) 
 1703–04: George Essone, merchant (died c.1705)  
 1704–07: John Black, bailie

References

See also
 List of constituencies in the Parliament of Scotland at the time of the Union

Burghs represented in the Parliament of Scotland (to 1707)
Politics of Fife
History of Fife
Constituencies disestablished in 1707
1707 disestablishments in Scotland